is a railway station located in Hiushinai in the Tanno-chō district of Kitami-shi city in Hokkaidō, Japan and is served by trains running on the Sekihoku Main Line, operated by JR Hokkaido. The station is located in one of the "coldest and remotest areas in Japan."

Station structure
Hiushinai is an unmanned station with two side platforms alongside two railway tracks. It has a toilet and a waiting room.

Station environs
Hiushinai elementary school
Hokkaidō highway 556
National highway 39

Adjacent stations

History
October 5, 1911: Station opened
January 10, 1983: Station became unmanned on completion of CTC system

References

Railway stations in Hokkaido Prefecture
Railway stations in Japan opened in 1912